The Success Glacier is a small glacier located on the southwestern slopes of Mount Rainier in Washington. The glacier is bounded to the northwest by the Success Cleaver and to the east by the Kautz Cleaver. Meltwater from the glacier drains into the Nisqually River.

See also
List of glaciers

References

Glaciers of Mount Rainier
Glaciers of Washington (state)